Michael George Broers (born 1954) is a British historian. Broers is the Professor of Western European History at the University of Oxford.

Broers attended the University of St Andrews (MA, 1978) and the University of Oxford (PhD, 1982).

Broers is the author of several academic books about revolutionary and Napoleonic Europe. He won the Grand Prix Napoléon prize, 2006. Professor Saul David in The Daily Telegraph wrote that Napoleon: The Spirit of the Age is perhaps the 'finest biography of Napoleon ever written'.

Broers has contributed to academic journals such as War in History, The Historical Journal and Central European History. He is on the editorial boards of the international journal Napoleonica La Revue, "an online review which aims to promote research in the history of the First and Second French Empires". Napoleonica La Revue, "published by the Fondation Napoléon, is academic, multidisciplinary, international and peer-reviewed".

Bibliography 

 Europe Under Napoleon, 1799-1815 (1996)
 Europe After Napoleon: Revolution, Reaction, and Romanticism, 1814-1848 (1996)
 Politics and Religion in Napoleonic Italy (2001)
 The Napoleonic Empire in Italy, 1796-1814 (2005)
 Napoleon's Other War: Bandits, Rebels and their Pursuers in the Age of Revolutions (2010)
 Napoleon: Soldier of Destiny (2014)
 The Napoleonic Mediterranean: Enlightenment, Revolution and Empire (2016)
 Napoleon: The Spirit of the Age: 1805-1810 (2018)
 Napoleon: The Decline and Fall of an Empire: 1811-1821 (2022)

References 

1954 births
Living people
British historians
Fellows of Lady Margaret Hall, Oxford
Historians of the University of Oxford
Alumni of the University of St Andrews
Alumni of the University of Oxford